"Sit and Wait" is a song recorded by American-German singer Sydney Youngblood. It was co-written by him and produced by Claus Zundel. The song was released in 1989 as the second single from his debut album, Feeling Free (1989), and was released in late 1989 and early 1990 in European countries. Like his previous single "If Only I Could", it had success on the charts, reaching the top 10 in Austria, the Netherlands, Sweden, Switzerland and West Germany. A music video was also produced to promote the single. It features the singer dressed as a military, performing and dancing with dancers at a cafe.

Critical reception
Paul Lester from Melody Maker wrote, "'Sit and Wait' is about as likely to get the nation's heels galloping as the Grace Jones record." Lola Borg from Smash Hits felt "it has an infectiously lovely rune, a haunting piano and Syd sounding like he's just won the pools so exuberant is his singing, and it all ends up making you feel like the world is a somehow a much nicer place."

Track listings
These are the formats and track listings of major single releases of "Sit and Wait".

 7" single / CD single
 "Sit and Wait" – 3:56
 "Feeling Free" – 4:00

 CD maxi
 "Sit and Wait" (stationary to stationary mix) – 7:06
 "Feeling Free" (the "jazzy who?" mix) – 6:00
 "If Only I Could" (the original 12") – 6:30

 12" maxi
 "Sit and Wait" (stationary to stationary mix) – 7:06
 "Sit and Wait" (dub) – 4:56
 "Feeling Free" (the "jazzy who?" mix) – 6:00

 12" maxi
 "Sit and Wait" (stationary to stationary mix) – 7:04
 "Feeling Free" (LP version) – 5:02
 "Feeling Free" (the "jazzy who?" mix) – 5:55

Credits
 Written by Claus Zundel, Mike Staab, Ralf Hamm and Sydney Youngblood
 Remix by Claus Zundel
 Artwork by Michael•Nash Assoc.
 Photography by Enrique Badulescu
 Arranged and produced by Claus Zundel

Charts

Weekly charts

Year-end charts

References

1989 singles
1990 singles
Sydney Youngblood songs
Songs written by Claus Zundel
1989 songs
Virgin Records singles